Lake Joondalup is a medium-sized freshwater lake in Perth, Western Australia. It is in the Perth northern suburbs of Joondalup, Wanneroo, and Edgewater. It is a nature reserve and part of the Yellagonga Regional Park.

Description
Lake Joondalup is Perth's largest metropolitan freshwater lake located in the Yellagonga Regional Park.  It has several islands, and a large sandbank during the dry summer months. The largest island is colloquially named "Snake Island" by locals for good reason as the wetland habitat supports a healthy population of various snakes, including the dugite and tiger snake.  The lake and bush reserve is a dynamic habitat supporting much wildlife including turtles, ducks and many other birds. Most of the banks are either swampland or reeds.

Significant natural attractions include Neil Hawkins Park, Joondalup and Picnic Cove, and Edgewater.  Neil Hawkins Park was named after a chairman of the former Metropolitan Region Planning Authority, and is a popular family park for tourists as well as locals. There is a small jetty over the lake and visitors can feed birds (although this practise is now discouraged), and have a barbecue. Limestone caves are located on its western shore just north of Neil Hawkins Park.  Edgewater is also the highest point to look out over the lake. It was formerly the site of a limestone quarry; many parks in the suburb have sheer cliffs and exposed limestone karst features exposed during its time as a quarry.

The areas around Lake Joondalup are home to many birds, including waterbirds on the lake.  The reserve lies within the Northern Swan Coastal Plain Important Bird Area, so identified by BirdLife International because of its importance in supporting several thousand Short-billed Black Cockatoos during the non-breeding season. It is also home to many types of frog.

See also

 List of lakes of Western Australia

References

External links
 Yellagonga Regional Park

Further reading
 Costello, Verna.(2003) Glistening attraction, Yellagonga Regional Park. Landscope (Como, W.A), Summer 2003, p. 20-25

Joondalup
Joondalup
Joondalup
Joondalup